Transcription factor SOX-11 is a protein that in humans is encoded by the SOX11 gene.

Function 

This intronless gene encodes a member of the group C SOX (SRY-related HMG-box) transcription factor family involved in the regulation of embryonic development and in the determination of the cell fate. The encoded protein may act as a transcriptional regulator after forming a protein complex with other proteins. The protein may function in the developing nervous system and play a role in tumorigenesis and adult neurogenesis. Tuj1 and Tead2 are suggested as direct target of Sox11.

Clinical aspect
Lymphocyte staining for SOX11 immunohistochemistry indicates mantle cell lymphoma (cyclin D1 positive and negative) rather than other mature lymphoid neoplasms or normal lymphocytes.

Mutations in SOX11 are associated with Coffin–Siris syndrome and mantle cell lymphoma.

See also 
 SOX genes

References

Further reading

External links 
 

Transcription factors